A Eurobalise is a specific variant of a balise being a transponder placed between the rails of a railway. These balises constitute an integral part of the European Train Control System, where they serve as "beacons" giving the exact location of a train as well as transmitting signalling information in a digital telegram to the train.

Overview 
A balise typically needs no power source. The provisions for Eurobalises to receive information from the train ('Downlink') has been removed from the specification. The transmission rate is sufficient to transmit at least three copies of a 'telegram' to be received by a train passing at any speed up to 500 km/h.

Eurobalises are typically placed in pairs on two sleepers in the center of the track. For ETCS they are typically spaced three metres apart. With the balises being numbered the train will know whether it travels in nominal (1→2) or reverse direction (2→1). Singular balises exist only when linked to a previous balise group or when their function is reduced to provide only the exact position. There may be up to 8 balises in a balise group.

Balises are differentiated as being either a Fixed Data Balise transmitting the same data to every train, or a Transparent Data Balise which transmits variable data, also called a Switchable or Controllable Balise. (Note that the word "fixed" refers to the information transmitted by the balise, not to its physical location. All balises are immobile).

Fixed Data Balise 
A Fixed Data Balise is programmed to transmit the same data to every train. Information transmitted by a fixed balise typically includes: the location of the balise; the geometry of the line, such as curves and gradients; and any speed restrictions. The programming is performed using a wireless programming device. Thus a fixed balise can notify a train of its exact location, and the distance to the next signal, and can warn of any permanent speed restrictions.

Transparent Data Balise 
A Transparent Data Balise is connected to a Lineside Electronics Unit (LEU), which transmits dynamic data to the train, such as signal indications and temporary speed restrictions. Balises forming part of an ETCS Level 1 signalling system employ this capability. The LEU integrates with the conventional (national) signal system either by connecting to the lineside railway signal or to the signalling control tower.

Euroloop 
A balise transmits telegrams at a specific site. To allow a continuous transmission the telegrams may be sent along leaky feeder cable being up to 1000 metres long. The Euroloop cable is always connected with a balise at its end which serves as the End of Loop Marker (EOLM). The telegram structure is the same as for the balise it is connected to. Originally the Euroloop used the same frequency as the Eurobalises but that was changed for specification 2.0.1 in September 2004. Euroloops had been used in Switzerland which completed the change in July 2010.

Modulation 
The downlink uses an amplitude modulation on the 27.095 MHz frequency. This frequency is used to power the passive balises (it is the intermediate channel 11A in CB radio).

The uplink uses frequency-shift keying with 3.951 MHz for a logical '0' and 4.516 MHz for a logical '1'. The data rate of 564.48 kBit/s is enough to transmit 3 copies of a telegram to a train passing at 500 km/h.

The Euroloop frequency was moved to a centre of 13.54750 MHz (exactly half of the Eurobalise power frequency).

Encoding 

Each pair of balises usually consists of a switchable balise and a fixed balise. A balise transmits a 'telegram' of either 1023 bits (93*11) or 341 bits (31*11) in the channel encoding with 11 bit per symbol. The user data block is cut into 10-bit user symbols before the scrambling and shaping operation - the effective payload of signalling information is 830 bit (83*10) for the long telegram and 210 bit (21*10) for the short telegram. The final telegram consists of
 shaped data (913 bit or 231 bit) containing the payload (830 or 210 bit)
 control bits (Cb, 3 bit)
 scrambling bits (Sb, 12 bit)
 extra shaping bits (Esb, 10 bit)
 checksum (CheckBits, 85 bit)

The telegram is broadcast in a cyclic manner as the train passes over the balise. To avoid transmission errors the payload is scrambled (avoiding burst errors), substituted with a symbol code of different Hamming distance, and a checksum is added for validity checks. Since the checksum is computed after the symbol substitution the telegram contains extra shaping bits to allow the resulting checksum bits to be filled up in a way that only valid symbols of the chosen channel code are in the telegram where each symbol has 11 bits.

The payload data consists of a header followed by multiple packets defined in the ERTMS protocols. Typical packets are:
 Packet 5 - Linking
 Packet 12 - Movement Authority
 Packet 21 - Gradient Profile
 Packet 27 - International Static Speed Profile
 Packet 255 - End of information

Many applications include optional packets like Packet 3 - National Values, Packet 41 - Level Transition Order, and Packet 136 - Infill Location Reference. If the telegram maximum of 830 bits is reached then more packets can be sent in the following balises of the same balise group - with up to 8 balises in a balise group the maximum ERTMS message per balise group can encompass 8 * 830 = 6640 bits (note that every telegram must contain a header and the trailer packet 255). A fixed balise transmits a stable message which typically can include the linking information, gradient profile, and speed profile. It may also contain track information such as route suitability data for different train types and axle load restrictions.

Almost all packet types contain a parameter flagging whether its information is relevant for the "nominal" or "reverse" direction (or both). If a train sees balise 1 before balise 2 then it passes over the group in the nominal direction. Consequently, some packets may be dropped by the application software of the receiver if they are not designated for the relevant direction. The ERTMS header block of 50 bits contains the ETCS version, the current number and total count of balises within a balise group (up to 8 balises), a flag whether it is a copy (up to 4 copies) that increases chances for the receiver to see the telegram of the balise in a group, a serial number flagging whether the message has changed lately, a 10-bit country identifier along with the 14-bit balise group identifier allowing for a unique ID of every balise group. The linking information informs about the distance to the next balise group (one linking packet per direction) and the required train reaction if the next balise group is missed (e.g. train stop). The movement authority packet defines a maximum speed that may be used for a given maximum distance and maximum time - setting the maximum speed to zero will force the train to stop. The gradient profile may have a variable length based on the contained pairs of section length (scalar and number in the metric system) and section gradient (uphill/downhill flag and a number in %). Similarly the international static speed profile is given in a variable count of section parts with each part denoting the section length (number in meters - the scale is only given once at the start of the packet for all sections), the maximum speed (number * 5 km/h - allowed numbers are 0-120 i.e. some spare values are left over) and a flag if the speed restriction applies to the front or rear end of the train (possibly allowing for a delay). The trailer packet only contains its packet id with no parameters where 255 equals the state of all bits set in the 8-bit packet id field (11111111).

Manufacture 

The history of ETCS has seen the formation of UNISIG (Union of Signalling Industry) in 1998 to promote the development of the system. The founding members were Alstom, Ansaldo, Bombardier, Invensys, Siemens and Thales. The group has ensured that Eurobalises may be made by several different companies; while the balises may vary in the details, they are manufactured to meet the same standards. The principal manufacturers of Eurobalises belong to a group of seven firms (Alstom, Ansaldo STS, Bombardier, Invensys, Siemens, Sigma-Digitek, Thales) within the UNIFE federation of railway suppliers.  This group cooperated in developing the specifications for Eurobalises. Specifications for Eurobalises are governed by the European Railway Agency.

Usage 
Eurobalises are not only used in the ETCS/ERTMS train protection system. There are alternative implementations that pick up on the telegram structure to encode only some packet types and adding additional specific information. ETCS trains may decode the telegrams possibly translating them like any other Class-B signalling information. It is also possible that a balise transmits telegrams for different systems allowing for a transitional phase from one variant to another as typically used when switching from a national train protection system to ETCS.

The following automatic train protection systems are based on Eurobalises:
 ETCS – the European-wide train protection system
 Chinese Train Control System versions CTCS-2 and CTCS-3, used on high speed rail lines in China
  – a variant of the earlier Swiss Integra-Signum train protection system
  – a variant of the earlier Swiss ZUB 121 train protection system
 SCMT – an Italian train protection system
 TBL1+ – a train protection system used in Belgium 
 GNT – the system to control tilting trains in Germany
 ZBS – a new rapid transit control system for the S-Bahn Berlin
  - an improved protection system for narrow-gauge railways in Switzerland built on top of ETCS hardware

Eurobalises have also been used in Germany to transmit tilting instructions for curves to tilting trains while keeping the traditional train protection system. The original GNT (Geschwindigkeitsüberwachung Neigetechnik) from Siemens had used specific coupling coils in 1992 (ZUB 122) and it was switched to Eurobalises in 2005 (ZUB 262). The additional telegram packet types for tilting trains have been added to the Baseline 3 series of ETCS.

History 
The direct predecessor of Eurobalises are the balises of the Ebicab train protection system. The Ebicab system was developed in Sweden (and Norway) by LMEricson and SRT. The Ebicab system was developed after a crash in Norway in 1975 (Tretten). Trial runs started in 1979, and in Norway the first line fully equipped with the system was operational in 1983. The adaptation of the Ebicab system in France is the KVB system. It had been developed after a crash in 1985 and it was deployed in the early 1990s on French lines. The name for the beacons: "balise" was however in use in the Ebicab system in the late 1970s.

About the same time the idea came up to develop a common train protection system for Europe leading to the 91/440/EEC as of 29 July 1991. Since 1993 the organizational framework was in place to publish TSI standards. This allowed for the first drafts of the new technology and since 1996 the elements were tested by six railway operators which had joined the ERTMS user group.

The Ebicab technology did already use the 27 MHz carrier frequency as well as putting the beacons in the center of the track. With Ebicab a single balise transmission had only 12 bit but it allowed for 2 to 5 balises in a balise group providing 24 to 80 bit of signalling information. Most of the patents on that encoding are held by GEC Alsthom. It was then up to ABB to extend the telegram size from 12 bit in EBICAB 700 to 180 bit in EBICAB 900 (after encoding 255 bit) as used in the Mediterranean Corridor in Spain. In that time Ansaldo adopted the balise type for the digital evolution of the Italian SCMT also becoming a second supplier for the balise type to other railways. These balise types were later collectively named KER balises from their usage in KVB, Ebicab and RSDD (Ripetizione Segnali Discontinua Digitale).

Another source for the technology comes from the Siemens ZUB 100 family where they used coupling coils at the side of the tracks to augment the existing train protection system with additional signalling. The first ZUB 111 beacon did just allow for 21 states (using 2 out of 7 frequencies). The successor ZUB 122 switched to a digital telegram modulated on an 850 kHz carrier. The telegram types of these systems are compatible with the ORE A46 specification for the German LZB telegrams (about 83 bits).

Siemens published a report showing the advantages of the balise technology for railway operations in 1992 and in the fall of 1995 they delivered prototypes of Siemens type S21 Eurobalise. ABB, Alsthom and Ansaldo did also cooperate in the development and the S21 balise along with other Eurobalise prototypes were tested from July to October 1996 at the Velim railway test circuit and the Austrian railways test lab (Forschungs- und Prüfzentrum Arsenal).

The Eurobalise FFFIS (Form Fit Function Interface Specification) was introduced to the ERMTS range of specifications as SUBSET-036. Its foreword describes the specification to be based on the results of EUROSIG consortium (ACEC Transport, Adtranz Signal, Alcatel SEL, GE C Alsthom Transport, Ansaldo Trasporti, CSEE Transport, SASIB Railway, Siemens, and Westinghouse Signal) that got financial support from the European Commission. The EUROSIG formed after the initial Eurobalise/Euroloop Project 92/94 leading into the actual ERTMS/EUROSIG Project 95/98 supported by the parallel EMSET Project 96/00 (testing the Eurocab specification).

When the EUROSIG project had ended the ETCS was still not ready for real world application. So 1998 saw the formation of UNISIG (Union of Signalling Industry), including Alstom, Ansaldo, Siemens, Bombardier, Invensys and Thales which were to take over the finalisation of the standard. The first baseline specification has been tested by six railways since 1999 as part of the European Rail Traffic Management System The railway companies defined some extended requirements that were added to ETCS including telegram packet types for RBC-Handover and track profile information - the resulting Class 1 Version 2.0.0 specification of ETCS was then published in April 2000.

References

External links 

 . Description of various telegram / packet types that Eurobalises can send.
  (1.12MB)
 

Train protection systems